The CERH European U-20 Roller Hockey Championship is a European roller hockey competition for men's under-20 national teams, currently organised by CERH. Established in 1953, the tournament was contested every two years between 1960 and 1968, after which it adopted an annual calendar. As of 2006, the championship reverted to a biennial competition.

The most successful team is Spain, with 23 titles, the most recent obtained at the 45th edition in 2006. The current champions are Portugal, who won the 2016 tournament in Pully, Switzerland, securing their fifth consecutive title.

Results

Tournaments

Medal table

References

External links 
CERH
World Skate Europe - all competitions

European Roller Hockey Junior Championship